Didymophysa is a genus of flowering plants belonging to the family Brassicaceae.

Its native range is Turkey to Western Pakistan.

Species:

Didymophysa aucheri 
Didymophysa fedtschenkoana 
Didymophysa fenestrata

References

Brassicaceae
Brassicaceae genera